Schizophrenia is the eleventh album by Wayne Shorter, recorded on 10 March 1967 and released on the Blue Note label. The album features five Shorter compositions and an arrangement of James Spaulding's "Kryptonite". The album features Shorter with alto saxophonist/flautist Spaulding, trombonist Curtis Fuller, pianist Herbie Hancock, bassist Ron Carter and drummer Joe Chambers.

Reception
The AllMusic review by Stephen Thomas Erlewine awarded the album 4½ stars stating "This music exists at the border between post-bop and free jazz – it's grounded in post-bop, but it knows what is happening across the border. Within a few years, he would cross that line, but Schizophrenia crackles with the excitement of Shorter and his colleagues trying to balance the two extremes".

Track listing
All compositions by Wayne Shorter except where noted.

 "Tom Thumb" – 6:16
 "Go" – 5:42
 "Schizophrenia" – 6:50
 "Kryptonite" (James Spaulding) – 6:29
 "Miyako" – 5:00
 "Playground" – 6:20

Personnel
Wayne Shorter – tenor saxophone
Curtis Fuller – trombone
James Spaulding – flute, alto saxophone
Herbie Hancock – piano
Ron Carter – bass
Joe Chambers – drums

References

External links 
 Wayne Shorter - Schizophrenia (1967) album releases & credits at Discogs
 Wayne Shorter - Schizophrenia (1967) album to be listened on Spotify

1969 albums
Blue Note Records albums
Wayne Shorter albums
Albums produced by Francis Wolff
Albums recorded at Van Gelder Studio